Sudeva Delhi Futsal is an Indian professional futsal club which is part of Sudeva Delhi FC, based in Delhi. The club competes in FD Futsal League and earlier in the Futsal Club Championship, the highest level of futsal club competition in India.

Recent seasons

References

Futsal clubs in India
Sports clubs in Delhi
Sports clubs established in 2014
Sudeva Delhi FC